Madrasa Hamzia is one of the madrasahs of the medina of Tunis. It was built in the 20th century by a rich bourgeois in order to host the University of Ez-Zitouna students coming from Mahdia, Tunisia.

Location 

The madrasa is located in Souk El Attarine, between the Khaldounia and the madrasa Asfouria. It is very close to the Al-Zaytuna Mosque.

History 
It was built in 1929 by Hassan Ben El Haj Hamza, a wealthy bourgeois from Mahdia, Tunisia.

It is the only madrasa in the medina of Tunis to host not only students but also teachers.

Evolution 
Nowadays, the madrasa is managed by the Tunisian Ministry of Culture.

References 

Hamzia